Astrapogon is a genus of cardinalfishes native to the western Atlantic Ocean.

Species
The recognized species in this genus are:
 Astrapogon alutus (D. S. Jordan & C. H. Gilbert, 1882) (bronze cardinalfish) 
 Astrapogon puncticulatus (Poey, 1867) (blackfin cardinalfish) 
 Astrapogon stellatus (Cope, 1867) (conchfish)

References

Apogoninae
Marine fish genera
Taxa named by Henry Weed Fowler